Jesús Dermit (14 March 1909 – 14 October 1988) was a Spanish racing cyclist. He rode in the 1930 Tour de France.

References

External links
 

1909 births
1988 deaths
Spanish male cyclists
Place of birth missing
Sportspeople from Bilbao
Cyclists from the Basque Country (autonomous community)